Darby Township may refer to:

Ohio 
 Darby Township, Madison County, Ohio
 Darby Township, Pickaway County, Ohio
 Darby Township, Union County, Ohio

Pennsylvania
 Darby Township, Delaware County, Pennsylvania
 Upper Darby Township, Delaware County, Pennsylvania

Township name disambiguation pages